The Oxford Test of English (OTE) is an on demand computer-adaptive test of English proficiency for non-native speakers of English, reporting at A2, B1, and B2 levels of the Common European Framework of Reference (CEFR). The test was developed by Oxford University Press (OUP) to provide learners of English with a quick, reliable way to prove their level of English proficiency for university entrance, employment and travel. The test is certified by the University of Oxford and is available worldwide.

History
The Oxford Test of English was developed over a number of years and launched in Spain in 2017, where it has gained wide recognition, including the Association of Language Centres in Higher Education (ACLES). The test was launched globally in April 2019 at the 53rd IATEFL conference at the Tate Liverpool. The test was shortlisted for 'best in summative assessment' in the 2020 e-Assessment Awards. In 2021, the test was independently evaluated by ECCTIS who reported the test as "A sound assessment of general English language proficiency".

Test specifications

Modules
The Oxford Test of English consists of four modules: Speaking, Listening, Reading, and Writing. Modules can be taken individually or in any combination. Full test specifications are available.

Computer adaptive
The Listening and Reading modules of the Oxford Test of English use computer-adaptive testing (CATs). Computer adaptive tests can be more efficient and provide more precise measurement than traditional tests. The adaptive test works by selecting each successive question from a large bank of questions, based on the test taker's response to the previous question. The gains in efficiency make for shorter tests, and there is evidence that this may reduce the amount of stress a test taker feels during the test, though some research has suggested that there is no relation between CATs and test anxiety or that CATs may introduce other causes of stress

Human marking
The Speaking and Writing modules are marked by trained assessors. Test taker's responses are divided into 'scripts' for marking.
For the Writing module, Script 1 (the Part 1 email response) is marked by one assessor, and Script 2 (the Part 2 essay or magazine/article response) is marked by another assessor, each marking on four criteria: Task fulfillment, Organization, Grammar, and Lexis. The marks from the two assessors are combined and converted into a standardized score.
For the Speaking module, responses to Part 1 and 2 are sent to one assessor, and Parts 3 and 4 to a separate assessor, each marking on four criteria: Task fulfillment, Pronunciation and fluency, Grammar, and Lexis. The marks from the two assessors are combined and converted into a standardized score.

Marking quality assurance
Marking quality by assessors is manage through a system of training and certification prior to marking, and the use of 'seeds', pre-calibrated scripts which the assessor must mark within tolerance. Marking out of tolerance leads to the assessor being re-standardized, retrained or suspended from marking.

Results
For test takers who have taken all four modules, a certificate is issued showing the CEFR level and standardized score for each module, and an overall CEFR level and overall score. Where three of fewer modules have been taken, a report card is issued for each module. Certificates reflect a test taker's best performance, so if a test taker re-takes a module and their performance improves, the improved score will be reflected in their certificate. Certificate results are for life, though receiving institutions such as universities may require results to be within a particular time frame.

Results for the Listening and Reading modules are available immediately after the completion of the test. Speaking and Writing results are available within 14 days.

The CEFR levels and standardized scores are shown in this table:

Test security
The test utilizes a number of measures to maintain test security and the integrity of the test results. This includes test administration only at approved test centres using trained staff; a secure browser which prevents access to unsanctioned applications during the test; assessors trained to identify potential malpractice; statistical monitoring.

Special requirements
The test can be taken with a range of accessibility accommodations, including display options for colour blindness, breaks during the test, and additional time.

Oxford Test of English for Schools
Launched in 2020, a 'secondary school' version of OTE, the Oxford Test of English for Schools, is a version of the test for test takers 12 to 16 years old. The Oxford Test of English for Schools is identical to The Oxford Test of English, with the following exceptions:
 The content is more appropriate for the age group 12-16
 The Speaking Voicemails require informal or neutral responses, but do not require formal responses

References 

Standardized tests for English language
Test